Prigorica is a village immediately north of Dolenja Vas in the Municipality of Ribnica in southern Slovenia. The area is part of the traditional region of Lower Carniola and is now included in the Southeast Slovenia Statistical Region.

Church
The local church is dedicated to Saints Peter and Paul and belongs to the Parish of Dolenja Vas. It is an 18th-century church that was rebuilt in 1855 and thoroughly renovated between 2005 and 2008.

History
During the Second World War, a number of civilians from Prigorica were abducted and murdered by the Partisans on July 28, 1942 and buried in the Žiglovica Cave Mass Grave in Ribnica. The bodies were recovered from the cave in 2016 and were buried in June 2017 at the cemetery in the hamlet of Videm. In October 2017, victims from the Konfin Shaft 1 Mass Grave and Konfin Shaft 2 Mass Grave were also buried at the cemetery.

References

External links
Prigorica on Geopedia

Populated places in the Municipality of Ribnica